Kathy Jordan and Elizabeth Smylie defeated the four-time defending champions Martina Navratilova and Pam Shriver in the final, 5–7, 6–3, 6–4 to win the ladies' doubles tennis title at the 1985 Wimbledon Championships.

Seeds

  Martina Navratilova /  Pam Shriver (final)
  Claudia Kohde-Kilsch /  Helena Suková (semifinals)
  Kathy Jordan /  Elizabeth Smylie (champions)
  Hana Mandlíková /  Wendy Turnbull (semifinals)
  Barbara Potter /  Sharon Walsh-Pete (quarterfinals)
  Svetlana Cherneva /  Larisa Savchenko (quarterfinals)
  Bettina Bunge /  Eva Pfaff (third round)
  Rosalyn Fairbank /  Anne Hobbs (first round)
  Betsy Nagelsen /  Anne White (third round)
  Jo Durie /  Chris Evert Lloyd (quarterfinals)
  Elise Burgin /  Alycia Moulton (third round)
  Lea Antonoplis /  Candy Reynolds (first round)
  Gigi Fernández /  JoAnne Russell (withdrew)
  Virginia Ruzici /  Andrea Temesvári (quarterfinals)
  Carling Bassett /  Andrea Leand (second round)
  Beverly Mould /  Paula Smith (third round)

Draw

Finals

Top half

Section 1

Section 2

Bottom half

Section 3

Section 4

References

External links

1985 Wimbledon Championships on WTAtennis.com
1985 Wimbledon Championships – Women's draws and results at the International Tennis Federation

Women's Doubles
Wimbledon Championship by year – Women's doubles
Wimbledon Championships
Wimbledon Championships